Beware of Children is a 2019 Norwegian drama film, written and directed by Dag Johan Haugerud.

Premise
During a break in school, Lykke, the daughter of a Labour Party member, seriously injures her classmate Jamie, the son of a right-wing politician.

Cast

Release
The film had its world premiere on 3 September 2019 at the 76th Venice International Film Festival during the Venice Days section. Beware of Children had a theatrical release in Norway on 13 September 2019.

Accolades

References

Norwegian drama films
2019 drama films
2010s Norwegian-language films